Kiiminkijoki is a river of Finland in the region of Northern Ostrobothnia. It flows for  into the Gulf of Bothnia.

Among the most impressive rapids on the river are Kalliuskoski in Puolanka, Kurimonkoski in Utajärvi, and Koitelinkoski in Kiiminki, Oulu.

See also
List of rivers in Finland

References

External links 

Rivers of Finland
Puolanka
Drainage basins of the Baltic Sea